Westover is a city in Monongalia County, West Virginia, United States. The population was 3,995 at the 2020 census. It is included in the Morgantown, WV Metropolitan Statistical Area.

History
Westover was named from its location over the river from Morgantown. Westover was incorporated on October 12, 1911.  Westover expanded from its original area to include Riverside on November 27, 1945, Morgan Heights, Fairmor and Maple Grove on November 22, 1947; and the area in which Westover Park was built on March 10, 1955.

Geography
Westover is located at  (39.635095, -79.974382).

Demographics

2010 census
As of the census of 2010, there were 3,983 people, 1,845 households, and 990 families living in the city. The racial makeup of the city was 91.2% White, 4.9% African American, 0.3% Native American, 1.1% Asian, 0.3% from other races, and 2.2% from two or more races. Hispanic or Latino of any race were 1.7% of the population.

There were 1,845 households, of which 22.6% had children under the age of 18 living with them, 36.0% were married couples living together, 12.6% had a female householder with no husband present, 5.0% had a male householder with no wife present, and 46.3% were non-families. 35.5% of all households were made up of individuals, and 11% had someone living alone who was 65 years of age or older. The average household size was 2.16 and the average family size was 2.79.

The median age in the city was 38 years. 17.8% of residents were under the age of 18; 11.6% were between the ages of 18 and 24; 28.5% were from 25 to 44; 26.8% were from 45 to 64; and 15.1% were 65 years of age or older. The gender makeup of the city was 50.1% male and 49.9% female.

2000 census
As of the census of 2000, there were 3,941 people, 1,807 households, and 1,004 families living in the city. The population density was 2,995.5 people per square mile (1,152.7/km2). There were 1,983 housing units at an average density of 1,507.2 per square mile (580.0/km2). The racial makeup of the city was 93.58% White, 3.48% African American, 0.20% Native American, 0.74% Asian, 0.03% Pacific Islander, 0.25% from other races, and 1.73% from two or more races. Hispanic or Latino of any race were 0.46% of the population.

There were 1,807 households, out of which 23.6% had children under the age of 18 living with them, 40.6% were married couples living together, 11.9% had a female householder with no husband present, and 44.4% were non-families. 35.3% of all households were made up of individuals, and 12.2% had someone living alone who was 65 years of age or older. The average household size was 2.18 and the average family size was 2.86.

In the city, the population was spread out, with 19.9% under the age of 18, 11.1% from 18 to 24, 29.5% from 25 to 44, 22.1% from 45 to 64, and 17.4% who were 65 years of age or older. The median age was 38 years. For every 100 females, there were 88.3 males. For every 100 females age 18 and over, there were 84.0 males.

The median income for a household in the city was $28,659, and the median income for a family was $43,469. Males had a median income of $29,355 versus $21,672 for females. The per capita income for the city was $18,199. About 10.0% of families and 17.8% of the population were below the poverty line, including 26.3% of those under age 18 and 5.2% of those age 65 or over.

Education
Monongalia County Schools operates area schools.

The zoned schools are Skyview Elementary School, Westwood Middle School, and University High School.

References

External links
 Westover Site

Cities in West Virginia
Cities in Monongalia County, West Virginia
Morgantown metropolitan area
West Virginia populated places on the Monongahela River